In-circuit testing (ICT) is an example of white box testing where an electrical probe tests a populated printed circuit board (PCB), checking for shorts, opens, resistance, capacitance, and other basic quantities which will show whether the assembly was correctly fabricated. It may be performed with a "bed of nails" test fixture and specialist test equipment, or with a fixtureless in-circuit test setup.

Fixtures for in-circuit testing 

A common form of in-circuit testing uses a bed-of-nails tester. This is a fixture that uses an array of spring-loaded pins known as "pogo pins". When a printed circuit board is aligned with and pressed down onto the bed-of-nails tester, the pins make electrical contact with locations on the circuit board, allowing them to be used as test points for in-circuit testing. Bed-of-nails testers have the advantage that many tests may be performed at a time, but have the disadvantage of placing substantial strain on the PCB.

An alternative is the use of flying probes, which place less mechanical strain on the boards being tested. Their advantages and disadvantages are the opposite of bed-of-nails testers: the flying probes must be moved between tests, but they place much less strain on the PCB.

Example test sequence 
 Discharging capacitors and especially electrolytic capacitors (for safety and measurement stability, this test sequence must be done first before testing any other items)
 Contact Test (To verify the test system is connected to the Unit Under Test (UUT)
 Shorts testing (Test for solder shorts and opens)
 Analog tests (Test all analog components for placement and correct value)
 Test for defective open pins on devices
 Test for capacitor orientation defects
 Power up UUT
 Powered analog (Test for correct operation of analog components such as regulators and opamps)
 Powered digital (Test the operation of digital components and Boundary scan devices)
 JTAG boundary-scan tests 
 Flash Memory, EEPROM, and other device programming
 Discharging capacitors as UUT is powered down

While in-circuit testers are typically limited to testing the above devices, it is possible to add additional hardware to the test fixture to allow different solutions to be implemented. Such additional hardware includes:

 Cameras to test for presence and correct orientation of components
 Photodetectors to test for LED color and intensity
 External timer counter modules to test very high frequencies (over 50 MHz) crystals and oscillators
 Signal waveform analysis, e.g. slew rate measurement, envelope curve etc.
 External equipment can be used for hi-voltage measurement (more than 100Vdc due to limitation of voltage that is provided) or AC equipment Source those have interface to PC as the ICT Controller
 Bead probe technology to access small traces that cannot be accessed by traditional means

Limitations 
While in-circuit test is a very powerful tool for testing PCBs, it has these limitations:

 Parallel components can often only be tested as one component if the components are of the same type (i.e. two resistors); though different components in parallel may be testable using a sequence of different tests - e.g. a DC voltage measurement versus a measurement of AC injection current at a node.
 Electrolytic components can be tested for polarity only in specific configurations (e.g. if not parallel connected to power rails) or with a specific sensor
 The quality of electrical contacts can not be tested unless extra test points and/or a dedicated extra cable harness are provided.
 It is only as good as the design of the PCB. If no test access has been provided by the PCB designer then some tests will not be possible. See Design For Test guidelines.

Related technologies 
The following are related technologies and are also used in electronic production to test for the correct operation of Electronics Printed Circuit boards:

 PCB electrical test of bare PCBs
 AXI Automated x-ray inspection
 JTAG Joint Test Action Group (Boundary Scan Technology)
 AOI automated optical inspection
 Functional testing (see Acceptance testing and FCT)

References

External links 
 In-Circuit Test Tutorial

Printed circuit board manufacturing
Hardware testing
Electronic test equipment